The Maranjab Desert is located in Aran va Bidgol, Esfahan province, Iran and  north-east of Kashan.

Desert cities
Maranjab Aran  and Bidgol in the northern city of Aran and Bidgol located in Isfahan province. This desert from north to Salt Lake Aran  and Bidgol, the West Desert Lakes issue and salt pond and dock Sultan Moreh, from East to desert sand dam and Desert National Park and the southern city of Aran and Bidgol is limited.

Maranjab is rich in terms of vegetation. The main vegetation consists of salt-friendly plants including tamarisk trees and bushes arch and is Qych.

See also

Iran
Kashan
Isfahan Province
Chale Sonbak Desert

References

External links
Deserts of Iran
 film| The watermelons in Chale Sonbak Desert

Deserts of Iran
Geography of Isfahan Province